Chang Kai-chen and Heidi El Tabakh were the defending champions but decided not to participate.
Karolína Plíšková and Kristýna Plíšková won the title, defeating Jamie Hampton and Noppawan Lertcheewakarn 5–7, 6–2, [10–2] in the final.

Seeds

  Arina Rodionova /  Yaroslava Shvedova (quarterfinals)
  Maria Kondratieva /  Sophie Lefevre (first round)
  Monica Niculescu /  Urszula Radwańska (quarterfinals, withdrew due to Niculescu's abdominal injury)
  Anne Keothavong /  Kathrin Wörle (quarterfinals)

Draw

Draw

References
 Main Draw
 Qualifying Draw

Odlum Brown Vancouver Open
Vancouver Open